This is a list of events in British radio during 2005.

Events

January
17 January – 268 radio stations, including national stations Classic FM and Virgin Radio, join together to broadcast UK Radio Aid, a twelve-hour event to raise money for the victims of the Asian tsunami.

February
6 February – Les Ross returns to BBC Radio WM to present a weekly Sunday morning show. He had last worked at the station in the early 1970s.

March
6 March – JK and Joel take over as presenters of The Official Chart.

April
No events

May
23 May – As BBC staff stage a one-day strike over announced job cuts, Terry Wogan crosses the picket line to present his show. Reportedly, he gave them a smile and wished them all well. He explained on air that the reason for doing so was that he was contracted to host Wake up to Wogan and hence was not directly employed by the BBC, and so could not legally strike with their employees.

June
5–10 June – BBC Radio 3 clears its airwaves for almost an entire week to broadcast the music of a single composer – Ludwig van Beethoven.  This is followed up at the end of the year with ten days of non-stop Johann Sebastian Bach which is broadcast in the run-up to Christmas. 
7 June – London's 102.2 Jazz FM is relaunched as 102.2 Smooth FM.
21 June – Emap buys Scottish Radio Holdings.

July
23 July – Les Ross takes over the Saturday breakfast show on BBC WM.
25 July – London's 102.2 Smooth FM signs a three year deal with Chelsea F.C. to provide exclusive match coverage of the club's games until the end of the 2007–08 season.

August
29 August – 106 Century FM is rebranded as Heart 106.

September
September – A year after BBC Radio 2 stopped broadcasting a weekly edition of Pick of the Pops, the programme returns as a Sunday afternoon show.
8–12 September – BBC Radio 5 Live devotes its daytime schedule to broadcast extensive live coverage of the deciding Ashes cricket match. Normally, the station provides reports into its regular programmes.
12 September – 
Radio Luxembourg returns to the airwaves after more than 12 years. It broadcasts  via Digital Radio Mondiale (DRM). During August of that year, the parent operating company of Radio Luxembourg conducted digital test broadcasts to the UK on 7145 kHz using DRM, as well as for a time at 7295 kHz DRM.
BBC Radio Norfolk switches on the West Runton transmitter, providing FM quality broadcasts of the station for North Norfolk, doing so as part of BBC Radio Norfolk's 25th birthday celebrations and a month or so later, stereo FM broadcast for West Norfolk begin on 104.4 MHz FM after more than 20 years of broadcasting in mono due to an off-air re-broadcast system which was unable to reproduce a clear noise free stereo signal.

October
13 October – BBC Radio 1 hosts the first John Peel Day, a year after John presented his final show for the station which was two weeks before his death.

November
3 November – BBC Coventry & Warwickshire returns as a stand-alone station.
25 November – The UK's first Islamic radio station, Islam Radio, is established in Bradford, West Yorkshire.

December
No events

Unknown
After being acquired by the CN Group, Kix 96 and its other sister stations in the south Midlands are rebranded as Touch FM.

Station debuts

21 February – Chill
7 June – 102.2 Smooth Radio
3 October – KMFM Ashford
1 November – Aston FM
25 November – Islam Radio
5 December – 102.6 & 106.8 Durham FM

Closing this year

Programme debuts
 7 January – Ed Reardon's Week on BBC Radio 4 (2005–Present)
 4 August – The Ape That Got Lucky on BBC Radio 4 (4–25 August 2005)
 3 October – The Dream Ticket with Nemone on BBC 6 Music (2005–2006)

Continuing radio programmes

1940s
 Sunday Half Hour (1940–2018)
 Desert Island Discs (1942–Present)
 Woman's Hour (1946–Present)
 A Book at Bedtime (1949–Present)

1950s
 The Archers (1950–Present)
 The Today Programme (1957–Present)
 Your Hundred Best Tunes (1959–2007)

1960s
 Farming Today (1960–Present)
 In Touch (1961–Present)
 The World at One (1965–Present)
 The Official Chart (1967–Present)
 Just a Minute (1967–Present)
 The Living World (1968–Present)
 The Organist Entertains (1969–2018)

1970s
 PM (1970–Present)
 Start the Week (1970–Present)
 You and Yours (1970–Present)
 I'm Sorry I Haven't a Clue (1972–Present)
 Good Morning Scotland (1973–Present)
 Newsbeat (1973–Present)
 File on 4 (1977–Present)
 Money Box (1977–Present)
 The News Quiz (1977–Present)
 Feedback (1979–Present)
 The Food Programme (1979–Present)
 Science in Action (1979–Present)

1980s
 Steve Wright in the Afternoon (1981–1993, 1999–Present)
 In Business (1983–Present)
 Sounds of the 60s (1983–Present)
 Loose Ends (1986–Present)

1990s
 The Moral Maze (1990–Present)
 Essential Selection (1991–Present)
 No Commitments (1992–2007)
 Wake Up to Wogan (1993–2009)
 Essential Mix (1993–Present)
 Up All Night (1994–Present)
 Wake Up to Money (1994–Present)
 Private Passions (1995–Present)
 Parkinson's Sunday Supplement (1996–2007)
 The David Jacobs Collection (1996–2013)
 Drivetime with Johnnie Walker (1998–2006)
 Sunday Night at 10 (1998–2013)
 In Our Time (1998–Present)
 Material World (1998–Present)
 Scott Mills (1998–Present)
 The Now Show (1998–Present)
 It's Been a Bad Week (1999–2006)
 Jonathan Ross (1999–2010)

2000s
 Dead Ringers (2000–2007, 2014–Present)
 BBC Radio 2 Folk Awards (2000–Present)
 Sounds of the 70s (2000–2008, 2009–Present)
 Big John @ Breakfast (2000–Present)
 Parsons and Naylor's Pull-Out Sections (2001–2007)
 Jammin' (2001–2008)
 Go4It (2001–2009)
 The Jo Whiley Show (2001–2011)
 Kermode and Mayo's Film Review (2001–Present)
 The Big Toe Radio Show (2002–2011)
 A Kist o Wurds (2002–Present)
 The Day the Music Died (2003–2007)
 Fighting Talk (2003–Present)
 Jeremy Vine (2003–Present)
 Mitch Benn's Crimes Against Music (2004–2006)
 Trevor's World of Sport (2004–2007)
 The Chris Moyles Show (2004–2012)
 Annie Mac (2004–Present)
 Elaine Paige on Sunday (2004–Present)

Ending this year
 18 May – Puzzle Panel (1998–2005)
 29 September – Jane Gazzo's Dream Ticket (2004–2005)
 October – Westway (1997–2005)
 18 October – Think the Unthinkable (2001–2005)
 9 November – Whispers'' (2003–2005)

Deaths
2 January – Cyril Fletcher, 91, comic monologuist
6 March – Tommy Vance, 63, disc jockey
19 March – John Ebdon, 81, radio broadcaster, Graecophile, author and director of the London Planetarium
7 November – Harry Thompson, 45, comedy producer, lung cancer
19 November – John Timpson, 77, news presenter (Today (BBC Radio 4))
20 November – Jonathan James-Moore, 59, former BBC Radio head of light entertainment, cancer
21 December – Hallam Tennyson, 85, radio producer (great-grandson of Alfred, Lord Tennyson), suspected murder

References

Radio
British Radio, 2005 In
Years in British radio